"Slow Life" is a science fiction novelette by American writer Michael Swanwick, originally published in the December 2002 issue of Analog Science Fiction. It won the Hugo Award for Best Novelette in 2003.

The story is set on Titan. The author wrote: "I liked Titan specifically because there was a lot known about its chemistry and geography, but most people were not familiar with it, so a story set there would feel fresh to them."

Plot summary
The first explorers on Titan find that the ocean is a weird chemical soup. There does not seem to be any life in it until one of the expedition members begins to believe that something is talking to her through her dreams.

References

Sources

Slow Life, story online

Short stories by Michael Swanwick
Hugo Award for Best Novelette winning works
2002 short stories
Works originally published in Analog Science Fiction and Fact
Fiction set on Titan (moon)